Cinq colonnes à la une was a French television news programme. The programme used to last on 90 minutes and featured investigative television journalism it was a critically acclaimed television show.

Bibliography 
 Hervé Brusini, Francis James, Voir la vérité, le journalisme de télévision, PUF, 1982
 Jean-Noël Jeanneney, Monique Sauvage, Télévision nouvelle mémoire, Seuil-INA, 1982 (tout entier consacré à 5 colonnes à la une)
 Pierre Desgraupes, Hors antenne, Quai Voltaire, 1992
 Robert Soulé, Lazareff et ses hommes, Grasset, 1992
 Yves Courrière, Pierre Lazareff ou le Vagabond de l’actualité, Gallimard, 1995
 Pierre Baylot (dir.), Les Magazines de reportage à la télévision, Cinémaction 84, Corlet-Télérama, 1997
 David Buxton, Le Reportage de télévision en France depuis 1959, L’Harmattan, 2000
 Aude Vassallo, La Télévision sous de Gaulle : Le contrôle gouvernemental de l'information (1958-1969), INA-De Boeck, 2005

References

1959 French television series debuts
1968 French television series endings
1950s French television series
1960s French television series

French-language television shows
French television news shows